The 1914 Colorado Silver and Gold football team was an American football team that represented the University of Colorado as a member of the Rocky Mountain Conference (RMC) during the 1914 college football season. Led by 14th-year head coach Fred Folsom, Colorado compiled an overall record of 5–1 with a mark of 4–1 in conference play, placing second in the RMC.

Schedule

References

Colorado
Colorado Buffaloes football seasons
Colorado Silver and Gold football